José Manuel Babak (Fram, Paraguay, 19 March 1986 or 22 April 1988) is a Paraguayan football midfield who formerly played for 2 de Mayo, and in 2012 for Boca Unidos in Argentina.

Teams
 Guaraní 2007
 2 de Mayo 2008
 Guaraní 2009–2010
 Boca Unidos 2010–2012
 Patronato 2012–2013
 Sportivo Luqueño 2014
 Chaco For Ever 2014-

References

External links
 Profile at BDFA 
 
 BDFA profile 

1986 births
Living people
Paraguayan footballers
Paraguayan expatriate footballers
Association football midfielders
Club Guaraní players
Boca Unidos footballers
Club Atlético Patronato footballers
Sportivo Luqueño players
Chaco For Ever footballers
Paraguayan expatriate sportspeople in Argentina
Expatriate footballers in Argentina